Technicolor Creative Studios SA is a French company that is involved in visual effects, motion graphics and animation services for the entertainment, media and advertising industries. Headquartered in Paris, France, it is a spin-off of Technicolor SA, which now renamed to Vantiva.

The company operates the visual effects, motion graphics and animation units for the films, episodic series and video games under their subsidiaries: Moving Picture Company (MPC), The Mill, Mikros Animation, and Technicolor Games.

Background 
The creation of Technicolor dates back in 1916 while the first version of said picture processing technology was filed in the U.S. patent application and followed by the later versions in the several decades. The original company that owned the technology, Technicolor Motion Picture Corporation, was co-founded by the Massachusetts Institute of Technology (MIT) graduates Herbert Kalmus and Daniel Frost Comstock in 1915. The first commercially film that used Technicolor is The Gulf Between, which released on September 13, 1917, and was lost in a fire incident on March 25, 1961.

Technicolor has been involved in ownership changes in several years. In 1982, MacAndrews & Forbes acquired Technicolor for $100 million, then sold it in 1988 to the British company Carlton Communications for $780 million. In 2001, French-based media and electronics company Thomson Multimedia acquired Technicolor from Carlton for $2.1 billion. On February 1, 2010, Thomson Multimedia changed its name to Technicolor SA, assuming the name of the picture processing technology which widely known in more than 95 years.

Prior to transforming the Production Services division into Creative Studios unit, Technicolor sold its post-production unit to Streamland Media on May 4, 2021.

History 
On May 19, 2021, the Production Services division of Technicolor SA, transformed into Technicolor Creative Studios in order to specifically "focused on the future of film, episodic, gaming, brand experiences and advertising". The unit has been led by Christian Roberton as the CEO, reporting to Technicolor SA CEO Richard Moat. With the formation of Technicolor Creative Studios, bringing the robust of studios such as The Mill, MPC, Mikros Animation, and Mr. X.<ref>{{cite news|title=Technicolor Unveils New Creative Organization and Vision to Go Beyond Imagination|url=https://www.technicolor.com/news/technicolor-unveils-new-creative-organization-and-vision-go-beyond-imagination|publisher=Technicolor SA|date=May 19, 2021|accessdate=November 16, 2022}}</ref> In January 2022, Technicolor Creative Studios announced the integration of MPC Advertising under The Mill as well as the integration of MPC Film, MPC Episodic and Mr. X under the MPC brand.

On February 24, 2022, when Technicolor SA announced the full year 2021 results, the company also intended to list and spin-off 65% of Technicolor Creative Studios through a distribution-in-kind to Technicolor shareholders, while Technicolor will remain listed on Euronext Paris and post-spin off will retain up to 35% ownership of TCS. The business operations of Technicolor will divided into Technicolor Creative Studios and Technicolor's Connected Home and DVD services, which later known as Vantiva. On September 27, 2022, Technicolor Creative Studios became independently public-listed company, while Technicolor SA eventually rebranded as Vantiva, completed the spin-off process.

 Operations 
Technicolor Creative Studios has four distinct operating units:
 Moving Picture Company (MPC), a global leader in VFX, animation and visualization for over 45 years. MPC involved in several projects, such as Apple TV+ documentary series Prehistoric Planet and Disney's 2019 remake of The Lion King.
 The Mill, a global network of award-winning VFX artists and creative technologists with decades of experiences across the advertising and branding. The Mill involved in several projects, such as the posters of the Jordan Peele film Nope.
 Mikros Animation, providing creative services for feature, long-form and short-form animation. Mikros has involved in several projects such as Paramount Animation feature film The SpongeBob Movie: Sponge on the Run and Nickelodeon animated series Star Trek: Prodigy.
 Technicolor Games, a division that applying the best VFX, animation and technologies for video games with the collaborative approach with several game developers. The projects which Technicolor Games involved such as WWE 2K22 and Tom Clancy's Rainbow Six Extraction''.

References

External links 
 

 
Companies based in Paris
Companies listed on Euronext Paris
Corporate spin-offs
French animation studios
French companies established in 2021
Organizations awarded an Academy Honorary Award
Television and film post-production companies
Visual effects companies